The Operation Draufgänger (German for "daredevil") was a German Wehrmacht military operation against the Yugoslav Partisans at the Montenegrin-Serbian border area, aimed at breaking the Partisan foothold on the Lim river which was a potential penetration point into Serbia. In turn, it was a Partisan counter-operation, known as the Andrijevica Operation. The operation began on 18 July on the Čakor–Gusinje–Andrijevica–Berane line, when Kampfgruppe E burnt down at least 16 villages and killed several hundreds inhabitants. From different directions, German troops attacked villages and a part approached Andrijevica, pushed out parts of two Partisan brigades, and then took over the town on 19 July and continued attacking. The staffs of the Partisan brigades assessed the combined German forces as inadequate and self-initiatively decided to attacks, resulting in great German losses. With the possibility to surround and destroy, the II Assault Corps gave the operational command on 23 July on general attack. From different directions the German troops were surrounded in the wider region of Murino on 24 July. On 28 July the Partisan 2nd, 5th and 17th divisions were ordered to move across the Ibar, which gave the opportunity for the 14th Regiment SS to break through Čakor towards Peć, while larger part of the 21st Division SS broke and many Albanians deserted. The German troops were decisively defeated, and the Partisans moved for action in Serbia. Operation Rübezahl followed.

At Velika, on 28 July, the 21st Division made up of Albanians killed at least 428 civilians, mostly children, women and elderly, as a reprisal to local support for the Partisans.

Order of battle
Axis
21st Waffen Mountain Division of the SS Skanderbeg (main force).
14th Regiment of the 7th SS Volunteer Mountain Division Prinz Eugen.
Brandenburgers.
Krempler Legion.
Part of 201 Brigade assault artillery
Kampfgruppe "Strippel", reinforced by the Grenadier-Regiment 363 of the 181st Infantry Division.
Kampfgruppe "Bendl", made up of two Albanian army/militia battalions. The Krempler Legion was attached to this battlegroup in September 1944.
Parts of the 5th SS Police Regiment
Bulgarian 24th Division
Vulnetari
unspecified Chetnik formations

Yugoslav Partisans
Parts of the 2nd Assault Corps

References

Sources

External links

Yugoslavia in World War II
Draufgänger
Battles involving the Yugoslav Partisans
Conflicts in 1944
1944 in Yugoslavia
July 1944 events
Andrijevica Municipality
Montenegro in World War II
Serbia in World War II
1944 in Montenegro
1944 in Serbia
Mass murder in 1944